Longimycelium tulufanense is a bacterium from the family Pseudonocardiaceae which has been isolated from sediments from Aiding Lake in China.

References

Monotypic bacteria genera
Actinomycetales
Bacteria described in 2013